Vrats dasht (Armenian: Վրաց դաշտ) is a term used by Armenian chroniclers to refer to lands of modern Northern Armenia and Southern Georgia. The region also used to go by the name of Gugark. According to the Armenian historian Ukhtanes of Sebastia, the town of Tsurtav is located in the region of "vrac' dasht" (Iberian Plain). Tsurtav is one of the main towns of the Gugark province.

Meaning 
The sentence "Vrats dasht" roughly translates into "Field of Georgians". Also, it is notable that its original name Gugark etymologically stands for "land of the Gugars" (a Kartvelian tribe) in the Armenian language.

Early history 
The first record of the region is associated with the king of Urartu, Argishti I in 785 BC, who records the region as part of the early Proto-Georgian tribal formation of Diauehi. He calls this specific area "Zabaha", which is the Urartean name for "Javakh" (endemic region of Javakhians).

It is also notable that, in the exact same year in 785 BC, after the region switched hands from native Diauehian rule into Urartian one, the Erebuni Fortress was founded (which later would become Yerevan, capital of Armenia), whose etymology stands for "to seize, pillage, steal, or kidnap" or, it may also mean "to take" or "to capture" and thus believe that the Erebuni at the time of its founding meant "capture", "conquest", or "victory". Which, obviously indicates the fact that king of Urartu conquered the region off Kartvelian Diauehi and built a stronghold on it.

After Urartian conquest, in 590 BC Urartu was destroyed by the Median attacks, which means that native tribes around the area would get independence. Then, the region became part of the kingdom of Iberia in 300 BC.

The region roughly came into the rule of Armenia in 189 BC, when Armenian king Artaxias I conquered it. And the domains of Artaxias, at first limited to the Araxes valley, were greatly enlarged at the expense of Iberia. But, in 35 AD, Pharsmanes I of Iberia returned the lost land and established dominance over the kingdoms of Armenia and Caucasian Albania.

According to Strabo, Armenia, though a small country at first, has taken away several Iberian regions such as Chorzenê and Gogarenê (which is also called Gugark). It is also remarkable that Armenia has also conquered Carenitis and Xerxenê, which used to border "Lesser Armenia" on which native dwellers were Mosyoneci and Chalyians, who were also Kartvelian tribes.

Assimilation into Armenia 
Up until the beginning of the 7th Century, the major culture in the region was Georgian. But, during the souring of relations with the Armenian Church, the Sassanid Empire forced all of its formal vassals to adopt the 'Armenian faith', the Miaphysite form of Christianity practised in Armenia which, eventually resulted in assimilation of the Georgians who lived in their ancestral land, due to being split from their Diaphysite church.

References 

Armenian culture
Culture of Georgia (country)
History of Georgia (country) by location